New Year's Evil is a Nancy Drew and Hardy Boys Supermystery crossover novel. It was published in 1991.

Nancy and the two brothers head out to Quebec City, Canada, Nancy to investigate sabotage on the set of Dangerous Loves, a television show with romance and thriller elements, and the brothers curious as to why a champion ice racing player, Andre Junot, died in the ice during the Winter Carnival. Nancy and the Hardys team up to find the culprit, with the list of suspects including a photographer and a television star.

References

External links
Supermystery series books

Supermystery
1991 American novels
1991 children's books
Novels set in Quebec